A tulip is a bulbous plant in the genus Tulipa.
The name is also commonly applied to an unrelated species, the American Tulip tree (Liriodendron tulipifera).

Tulip or Tulips may also refer to:

Arts and entertainment

Music
Tulip (album), a 1990 album by Steel Pole Bath Tub
"Tulips" (song), by Bloc Party from their 2004 EP Little Thoughts

Other
Tulips (poem), by Sylvia Plath, about her experiences in a mental hospital
Tulips (film), a 1981 comedy-drama film
Tulip Jones, a character in the Alex Rider spy novel series
Tulip O'Hare, a fictional character from the comic book series Preacher

In the military
, two Royal Navy ships
, two US Navy vessels

Businesses
Tulip Computers, a Dutch PC clone manufacturer from 1979 to 2009
Tulip Telecom, an Indian telecommunications services provider
Tulip Television, a TV station affiliated with the Japan News Network
TULIP Cooperative Credit Union, Olympia, Washington
Tulip Radio, the local community radio station covering Spalding, Lincolnshire, England

People
Tulip (name), a list of people with either the given name or surname

Places
In the United States
Tulip, Indiana, an unincorporated community
Tulip Viaduct, Indiana
Tulip, Missouri, an unincorporated community
Tulip, Ohio, an unincorporated community

TULIP
The Five Points of Calvinism, summarized under the acrostic TULIP
Transurethral laser-induced prostatectomy
Trade Unions Linking Israel and Palestine, a group advocating engagement between trade unions (and against boycotts) as a means to Mideast peace

Other
Tulip (software), a Computer Graph Visualization program
Tulip Methodist Church, Marsalis, Louisiana, on the National Register of Historic Places
Tulip Rally, the oldest Dutch rally competition
Tulip (tower), proposed but rejected tower in London
Tulip Bowl, the final match in the top division, American Football Bond Nederland, in the Netherlands
Atorvastatin, a drug better known by the trade name Lipitor and under the brand name Tulip

See also
Tulip period, a period in Ottoman history (1718–1730)
The Kyrgyz Tulip Revolution of 2005
2S4 Tyulpan ("Tulip"), a Soviet self-propelled mortar
Tulip Mania, a speculative bubble in tulips peaking in February 1637